Voronino is a rural locality (a selo) in Yugskoye Rural Settlement, Cherepovetsky District, Vologda Oblast, Russia. The population was 18 as of 2002. There are 4 streets.

Geography 
Voronino is located 15 km southeast of Cherepovets (the district's administrative centre) by road. Gorka is the nearest rural locality.

References 

Rural localities in Cherepovetsky District